Arun Bali (23 December 1942 – 7 October 2022) was an Indian actor who has worked in numerous films and television series. He played the part of King Porus in the 1991 period drama Chanakya, Kunwar Singh in the Doordarshan soap opera Swabhimaan and the Chief Minister of undivided Bengal, Huseyn Shaheed Suhrawardy, in the controversial and critically acclaimed 2000 film Hey Ram. In the 2000s, he became known for his "grandfatherly" roles like that of Harshvardhan Wadhwa in Kumkum and has even garnered popular awards for the same.

In 2001, the prominent writer, actor and director Lekh Tandon counted Bali amongst his favorite actors.

He died at his home in   suburban Mumbai on 7 October 2022, at the age of 79 and was treated for Myasthenia gravis prior to his death.

Filmography

Films

 Saugandh (1991)
 Yalgaar (1992) as Home Minister Uday Narayan.
 Raju Ban Gaya Gentleman (1992)
 Heer Ranjha (1992)
 Khalnayak (1993)
 Kayda Kanoon (1993)
 Phool Aur Angaar (1993)... Justice Chaudhary
 Aa Gale Lag Jaa (1994)  Mohanlal
 Aaja Meri Jaan (1993)
 Ram Jaane (1995)... Paowala Baba
 Policewala Gunda (1995)... Central Govt Minister
 Masoom... Commissioner
 Sabse Bada Khiladi (1995)
 Return of Jewel Thief (1996)
 Raajkumar (1996)
 Satya (1998)... Home Secretary Mr Sharma
 Dand Nayak... Commissioner of police
 Shikari (2000)
 Hey Ram (2000) ... Shaheed Suhrawardy
 Laado (2000)... Inder's Father (Haryanvi Movies)
 Om Jai Jagadish (2002)...Anil Khanna,College Principal
 Aankhen (2002)
 Zameen (2003) ... Pakistani Home Minister
 Armaan (2003)
 Lage Raho Munna Bhai (2006)... 2ND innings resident
 Mere Jeevan Saathi (2006)
 Gumnaam - The Mystery (2008)
 Munde U.K. De (2009)... Gurdit Singh
 3 Idiots (2009)... Shyamaldas Chanchad (Cameo appearance)
 Sat Sri Akal (2009)
 Ready (2011) as Guruji
 Barfi! (2012) as Jhilmil's grandfather
 OMG – Oh My God! (2012) as Accha Sadhu
 Kaum De Heere (2014 Punjabi Film)
 Punjab 1984 (2014)
 PK (2014) as the Old Sikh man in restaurant who wants money from Pk
 Utopia (2015)
 Bhaag Johnny (2015) as Acharya Ji
 Airlift (2016) as Kohli's father
 1920: London (2016)
 Baaghi as Father of Ronnie (Voice only)
 Baaghi 2 (2018 film) as the Gurudwara priest
 Manmarziyaan (2018) as Rumi's Grandfather
 Kedarnath (2018) as Chief Priest
 Panipat (2019) as Ala Singh
 Samrat Prithviraj as Arnoraja
 Laal Singh Chaddha (2022) as Old man in Train
 Goodbye (2022) as Gayatri's father

Television
 Doosra Kewal (TV Series) (1989)
 Phir Wahi Talash (TV Series) (1989-90)
 Neem ka Ped (TV Series) 1990–1994
 Dastoor (TV Series) 1996
 Dil Dariya (TV Series) (1989)
 Chanakya (1991)... King Porus
 Dekh Bhai Dekh (1993-1994)... Various characters
 The Great Maratha (1994) -  Mughal emperor Alamgir II
 Mahabharat Katha (1997) - Chitravahan (Chitrangada's Father)
 Shaktimaan
 Zee Horror Show (1 episode – "Raaz", 1994)
 Sidhhi (1995)... Guru
 Aarohan (The Ascent)
 Swabhimaan (1995)... Kunwar Singh
 Maharath (1996)... Vrahaspati
 The Peacock Spring (1996)... Prof. Asutosh
 ...Jayate (1997) Judge
 Aahat (1997)
 Chamatkaar (1998)... Fake sage
  Amrapali  (2002)
 Des Mein Niklla Hoga Chand (2002)
 Kumkum – Ek Pyara Sa Bandhan  (2002)
 Woh Rehne Waali Mehlon Ki (2007)
 Maayka (2007)
 Maryada: Lekin Kab Tak? (2010)... Babuji
 I Luv My India (2012)... Premnath
 Devon Ke Dev...Mahadev (2012)... Vajraang
 Jai Ganesha as Brahmadev
 P.O.W. - Bandi Yuddh Ke (2016)... Harpal Singh

References

External links
 

1942 births
2022 deaths
Indian male film actors
Male actors in Hindi cinema
Indian male television actors
Indian male soap opera actors